Yugoslavia hosted the 1979 Mediterranean Games in Split and finished first in the medal table with 127 medals.

Medalists 

Yugoslavia at the 1979 Mediterranean Games at the Olympic Museum Belgrade website
1979 Official Report at the International Mediterranean Games Committee

Nations at the 1979 Mediterranean Games
1979
Mediterranean Games